Armando Broja (born 10 September 2001) is a professional footballer who plays as a forward for Premier League club Chelsea. Born in England, he plays for the Albania national team.

Club career

Early career
Broja was born in Slough, England, to Albanian parents from Koplik, Malësi e Madhe District. He began his football career with Burnham Juniors, then had trials with Reading and Fulham, before signing with Tottenham Hotspur and joining their under-8 selection.

Chelsea
After a two-year stint at Tottenham, Broja transferred to Chelsea and joined their academy in 2009. With the under-18 side, he won the domestic treble of U18 Premier League, U18 Premier League Cup and FA Youth Cup in 2017–18. He also won the Premier League 2 with the under-23s in 2019–20, scoring three goals in ten appearances.

On 26 February 2020, Broja signed his first professional contract with the club after agreeing to a two-year deal. On 8 March, he made his professional debut in a 4–0 Premier League win against Everton after coming on as a substitute in the 86th minute in place of Olivier Giroud.

2020–21 season: Loan at Vitesse
On 21 August 2020, Broja signed for Vitesse on a season-long loan. On 19 September, he scored his first ever league goal in a 2–0 win over Sparta Rotterdam. Broja finished his loan spell at Vitesse as their joint-top scorer in the Eredivisie for the 2020–21 season, netting ten goals.

2021–22 season: Loan at Southampton
On 18 July 2021, Broja signed a new five-year contract with Chelsea. On 10 August 2021, he was loaned to fellow Premier League club Southampton for the 2021–22 season. On his debut on 25 August, he scored two goals in an 8–0 win over League Two side Newport County in the second round of the EFL Cup. On 16 October, Broja scored his first league goal for The Saints in a 1–0 win against Leeds United, and became the first Albanian player to score in the Premier League.

2022–23 season
On 2 September 2022, Broja signed a new long-term contract until 2028 with Chelsea. He scored his first Chelsea goal in his sixth league appearance of the season, sealing a 3–0 home win against Wolverhampton Wanderers on 8 October 2022.

International career
Broja was eligible to play for England through his place of birth, and for Albania through his Albanian parents. In early 2019, he declined an invitation by the England under-21 team as his desire was to play only for Albania.

Under-19
Broja received his first international call-up from the Albania under-19 team by coach Nevil Dede for the first gathering of 2019 in February. He was then called up for a double friendly against North Macedonia the following month. Broja made his international debut in the first game played on 24 March, when he started the match and scored in the 60th minute for the final score of 1–1. He started again in the second game two days later, putting his side 1–0 up in the 10th minute, but North Macedonia overturned the score and won 2–1. In May 2019, he received a call-up for another double friendlies against Kosovo. Broja was named in the starting line-up in the first match, and also scored his side's third goal in a 3–1 away win. Two days later, Albania won 4–1 over Kosovo with Broja scoring twice.

In November, Broja was invited to participate in the 2020 UEFA European Under-19 Championship qualification Group 4 where his side were shorted to play against Greece, Belgium and Iceland. He played the full 90 minutes in the first match versus Greece where his side were beaten 5–1, and against Belgium where he managed to score a consolation goal in the second half as Albania lost 2–1. In the thid game against Iceland, he started the match and helped his side to score two goals in the first half, but received a red card in the 65th minute as Iceland eventually overturned the game and won 4–2.

Under-21
On 9 June 2019, Broja made his debut with the Albanian under-21 side in the friendly match against Wales after coming on as a substitute in the 46th minute in place of Din Sula, and scored his side's two goals during a 2–1 home win.

Senior
In May 2019, Broja received a call-up from Albania for a training camp in Durrës, Albania from 21 to 26 May 2019.

On 7 September 2020 he made his debut in a 1–0 home loss against Lithuania. On 5 September 2021, Broja scored his first senior goal in the 2022 FIFA World Cup qualifying match against Hungary, helping his team to a 1–0 victory.

Career statistics

Club

International

Scores and results list Albania's goal tally first, score column indicates score after each Broja goal.

References

External links

Armando Broja at Albanian Football Association

2001 births
Living people
Sportspeople from Slough
Footballers from Berkshire
Albanian footballers
Association football forwards
Albanian expatriate footballers
Albania youth international footballers
Albania under-21 international footballers
Albania international footballers
English footballers
English expatriate footballers
English people of Albanian descent
Tottenham Hotspur F.C. players
Chelsea F.C. players
SBV Vitesse players
Southampton F.C. players
Premier League players
Eredivisie players
Albanian expatriate sportspeople in the Netherlands
English expatriate sportspeople in the Netherlands
Expatriate footballers in the Netherlands